Mahmoud Abbas (born July 29, 1988) is an Arab-Israeli football midfielder, currently playing for Maccabi Tamra, his previous clubs include Hapoel Umm al-Fahm, Ahva Arraba, Hapoel Ashkelon, Hapoel Tel Aviv, Bnei Sakhnin and Hapoel Acre.

Honors
Israeli Premier League:
Runners-up (1): 2011–12 (with Hapoel Tel Aviv)
Liga Alef North (1):
2008–09 (with Ahva Arraba)
Israel State Cup (1):
2011–12 (with Hapoel Tel Aviv)
Toto Cup Leumit (1):
2014–15 (with Hapoel Bnei Lod)

Statistics

References

1988 births
Living people
Arab citizens of Israel
Arab-Israeli footballers
Israeli footballers
Association football midfielders
Hapoel Umm al-Fahm F.C. players
Ahva Arraba F.C. players
Hapoel Ashkelon F.C. players
Hapoel Tel Aviv F.C. players
Bnei Sakhnin F.C. players
Hapoel Bnei Lod F.C. players
Hapoel Acre F.C. players
Shimshon Kafr Qasim F.C. players
Hapoel Ironi Baqa al-Gharbiyye F.C. players
Maccabi Ironi Tamra F.C. players
Israeli Premier League players
Liga Leumit players
Footballers from Haifa